Death Takes a Holiday is a 1971 American made-for-television drama fantasy romance film directed by Robert Butler and starring Yvette Mimieux, Monte Markham, Bert Convy and Melvyn Douglas.

It was a remake of Death Takes a Holiday. The Los Angeles Times called it a "rare and elegant treat".

Plot
Death takes a human form and visits Earth to find out why humans want so desperately to cling to life. He unexpectedly falls in love with a beautiful young woman.

Cast
 Yvette Mimieux as Peggy Chapman
 Monte Markham as David Smith
 Myrna Loy as Selena Chapman
 Bert Convy as John Cummings
 Melvyn Douglas as Judge Earl Chapman

See also
 List of American films of 1971

References

External links

1971 television films
1971 films
ABC network original films
American drama television films
Films directed by Robert Butler